Cycling at the 2005 Southeast Asian Games was split into four categories:

Track, held at the Amoranto Velodrome in Quezon City, Metro Manila, Philippines.
Criterium, held on Roxas Boulevard, Manila
Road, held on the streets of Tagaytay, Cavite, Philippines.
Mountain, held at the Ramon M. Durano Sports Complex, Danao, Cebu, Philippines.

Results

Track Racing
Men's

Criterium
Men's

Road

Mountain

External links
Southeast Asian Games Official Results

2005 Southeast Asian Games events
2005
Southeast Asian Games
International cycle races hosted by the Philippines
2005 in track cycling
2005 in road cycling
2005 in mountain biking